Trikusuma Wardhana (born 20 November 1988) is an Indonesian badminton player who affiliate with Exist Jakarta club.

Career 
Wardhana comes from East Java regional training center, and also trained at the Jaya Raya Suryanaga badminton club in Surabaya. In 2009, he failed to join Indonesia national badminton team. In December 2009, he became the champion at the India Grand Prix tournament in men's doubles event partnered with Fauzi Adnan after beat Indian pair Akshay Dewalkar and Jishnu Sanyal. In 2013, he also won the Croatian International tournament in men's doubles event partnered with Christopher Rusdianto.

Achievements

BWF Grand Prix 
The BWF Grand Prix had two levels, the BWF Grand Prix and Grand Prix Gold. It was a series of badminton tournaments sanctioned by the Badminton World Federation (BWF) which was held from 2007 to 2017.

Men's doubles

  BWF Grand Prix Gold tournament
  BWF Grand Prix tournament

BWF International Challenge/Series 
Men's doubles

Mixed doubles

  BWF International Challenge tournament
  BWF International Series tournament
  BWF Future Series tournament

References

External links 

 
 

Living people
1988 births
Sportspeople from Makassar
Indonesian male badminton players
20th-century Indonesian people
21st-century Indonesian people